McCowen is a surname. Notable people with the surname include:

Alec McCowen (1925–2017), English actor
Baloy McCowen (1893–1959), American illustrator
Christopher McCowen, American criminal
Donald McCowen (1908–1998), British rower
Edward Oscar McCowen, American politician